Montague is a city in Siskiyou County, California, United States.  Its population is 1,226 as of the 2020 census, down from 1,443 from the 2010 census.

Name
When the Southern Pacific Railroad extension was built from Dunsmuir, California to the state line in 1886-87, the station was named for S.S. Montague, chief engineer of the Central Pacific Railroad.

Geography
Montague is located at  (41.727168, -122.526468).

According to the United States Census Bureau, the city has a total area of 1.8 square miles (4.6 km), 99.15% of it land and 0.85% of it water.

Located 6 miles east of Interstate 5 at Yreka along California State Route 3, this is also the site of the interchange between the Yreka Western Railroad and the Central Oregon and Pacific Railroad. General aviation is served at Montague Airport, which also serves Yreka.

Climate

Montague has a Mediterranean climate closely bordering on a steppe climate, very unusual for its location west of the Cascade Crest. Montague and the Shasta Valley are located in a rain shadow created by the Klamath Mountains, giving the area a climate and vegetation type more similar to points east of the Cascades, with average annual precipitation similar to Bend, Oregon. Rainfall is nonexistent in summer, except for the very occasional thunderstorm. The area experiences cool to cold winters with somewhat frequent snowfall, and hot summers with large diurnal temperature variation and nearly constant sunshine.

Demographics

2010
At the 2010 census Montague had a population of 1,443. The racial makeup of Montague was 1,251 (86.7%) White, 4 (0.3%) African American, 67 (4.6%) Native American, 8 (0.6%) Asian, 1 (0.1%) Pacific Islander, 17 (1.2%) from other races, and 95 (6.6%) from two or more races. Hispanic or Latino of any race were 107 people (7.4%).

The census reported that 1,425 people (98.8% of the population) lived in households, 18 (1.2%) lived in non-institutionalized group quarters, and no one was institutionalized.

There were 576 households, 198 (34.4%) had children under the age of 18 living in them, 255 (44.3%) were opposite-sex married couples living together, 86 (14.9%) had a female householder with no husband present, 31 (5.4%) had a male householder with no wife present.  There were 64 (11.1%) unmarried opposite-sex partnerships, and 1 (0.2%) same-sex married couples or partnerships. 159 households (27.6%) were one person and 49 (8.5%) had someone living alone who was 65 or older. The average household size was 2.47.  There were 372 families (64.6% of households); the average family size was 2.95.

The age distribution was 368 people (25.5%) under the age of 18, 119 people (8.2%) aged 18 to 24, 382 people (26.5%) aged 25 to 44, 390 people (27.0%) aged 45 to 64, and 184 people (12.8%) who were 65 or older.  The median age was 37.9 years. For every 100 females, there were 95.3 males.  For every 100 females age 18 and over, there were 96.2 males.

There were 633 housing units at an average density of 353.0 per square mile, of the occupied units 371 (64.4%) were owner-occupied and 205 (35.6%) were rented. The homeowner vacancy rate was 2.4%; the rental vacancy rate was 10.4%.  886 people (61.4% of the population) lived in owner-occupied housing units and 539 people (37.4%) lived in rental housing units.

2000
At the 2000 census there were 1,456 people in 560 households, including 390 families, in the city. The racial makeup of the city was 89.01% White, 0.07% African American, 5.08% Native American, 0.14% Asian, 0.07% Pacific Islander, 2.20% from other races, and 3.43% from two or more races. Hispanic or Latino of any race were 5.43%.

Of the 560 households 36.3% had children under the age of 18 living with them, 50.4% were married couples living together, 14.5% had a female householder with no husband present, and 30.2% were non-families. 25.4% of households were one person and 12.0% were one person aged 65 or older.  The average household size was 2.57 and the average family size was 3.07.

The age distribution was 28.7% under the age of 18, 8.1% from 18 to 24, 27.0% from 25 to 44, 24.0% from 45 to 64, and 12.2% 65 or older.  The median age was 36 years. For every 100 females, there were 97.0 males.  For every 100 females age 18 and over, there were 91.5 males.

The median income for a household in the city was $22,991, and the median family income  was $28,672. Males had a median income of $30,455 versus $22,250 for females. The per capita income for the city was $12,661.  About 19.6% of families and 24.2% of the population were below the poverty line, including 34.0% of those under age 18 and 10.8% of those age 65 or over.

Government

References

External links

Cities in Siskiyou County, California
Incorporated cities and towns in California